Salvia meiliensis is a perennial plant that is native to Anhui province in China, found growing on roadsides at  elevation.

Notes

meiliensis
Flora of China